The Jenkins' Ferry Battleground State Park is the site of the American Civil War battle of Jenkins' Ferry, also known as the Engagement at Jenkins' Ferry, fought on Saturday, April 30, 1864, in present-day Grant County, Arkansas. The park was listed in the U.S. National Register of Historic Places on January 21, 1970, and, with seven other sites, is part of the Camden Expedition Sites National Historic Landmark, designated a National Historic Landmark District on April 19, 1994.

Description and administrative history 
The Jenkins' Ferry Battleground State Park, operated by the Division of State Parks, Arkansas Department of Parks, Heritage, and Tourism, includes historic markers that describe the Civil War battle, as well as recreational opportunities on the Saline River, including swimming and boating.

Act 10 of 1961 (by the 63rd Arkansas General Assembly) established Jenkins’ Ferry Battleground State Park. One of three parks that commemorate the Camden Expedition, the site is also a Red River Campaign National Historic Landmark. The state park is set in a bend of the Saline River, which generally flows northwest to southeast, meandering southwest at this point. It has picnic tables and fire pits, and a basic comfort station, as well as interpretive signs explaining the region's historical significance. The park includes a portion of the original road between Little Rock and Camden, as well as the eastern end of the Jenkins' Ferry crossing.

See also 
List of Arkansas state parks
List of National Historic Landmarks in Arkansas
National Register of Historic Places listings in Grant County, Arkansas

References

External links

 
 Jenkins' Ferry Battleground State Park at American Battlefield Trust

 
1961 establishments in Arkansas
Arkansas Heritage Trails System
Battlefields of the Trans-Mississippi Theater of the American Civil War
Camden Expedition Sites National Historic Landmark
Conflict sites on the National Register of Historic Places in Arkansas
National Register of Historic Places in Grant County, Arkansas
Parks in Grant County, Arkansas
Parks on the National Register of Historic Places in Arkansas
Protected areas established in 1961
State parks of Arkansas